Catherine Millet (born 1 April 1948 in Bois-Colombes, Hauts-de-Seine) is a French writer, art critic, curator, and founder and editor of the magazine Art Press, which focuses on modern art and contemporary art.

Biography
Born in Bois-Colombes, France, she is best known as the author of the 2002 memoir The Sexual Life of Catherine M.; the book details her sexual history, from childhood masturbation to an adult fascination with group sex. The book was reviewed by Edmund White as "the most explicit book about sex ever written by a woman".

In 2008 she published a sequel of sorts called Jour de Souffrance, translated to English in 2009 as Jealousy: The Other Life of Catherine M.

She is married to the poet and novelist Jacques Henric.

In April 2016, Catherine Millet received the Prix François Morellet from Régine Catin, Laurent Hamon and Philippe Méaille. Awarded during the National Days of Book and Wine (Saumur), in partnership with the Château de Montsoreau-Museum of Contemporary Art, it rewards a personality for his commitment and his writings in favor of contemporary art.

On December 2017, during an interview on the French radio France Culture she claimed "I really regret not having been raped, because I could show that you can recover from it".

In January 2018 she co-authored a public letter to Le Monde newspaper criticising the #MeToo movement. The letter was signed by over a hundred French women, including actress Catherine Deneuve, and generated considerable controversy.

Decorations 
 Officer of the Order of Arts and Letters (2016)

References

External links
Books That Changed My Life PEN World Voices at the New York Public Library May 4, 2008
 Guardian Unlimited Book: Interview, Catherine Millet
 The Actual Lives of Catherine Millet and Robert Storr

1948 births
Living people
People from Bois-Colombes
French art critics
French women art critics
French memoirists
French erotica writers
Women erotica writers
Officiers of the Ordre des Arts et des Lettres
French art curators
French women curators